Kim Byung-ji (born 8 April 1970) is a former football goalkeeper who played for the South Korea national team as well as several clubs in the K League. He was noted for his unique hair style which looked like the tail of a bird.

Playing career
Kim spent 24 seasons as a professional player from 1992 to 2015. He kept 229 clean sheets and scored three goals while playing 706 games in the K League including Korean League Cup.

Kim was selected for the South Korean squad for the 1998 FIFA World Cup. South Korea lost 5–0 to the Netherlands in its second match, and South Korean players couldn't avoid journalists' criticisms after the defeat. Furthermore, South Korea's manager Cha Bum-kun was sacked, although the tournament was ongoing. However, Kim struggled in the Netherlands' 17 shots on target, and became the only player to receive acclaim despite conceding five goals.

Style of play
Kim played as a sweeper-keeper who helped the defense of his teams with rapid pace. He also had great reflexes, and was skilled in making super saves. However, his excessively active personality sometimes resulted in eccentric plays. In a match of the 2001 Lunar New Year Cup against Paraguay, he was deprived of the ball after he suddenly tried to dribble, and embarrassed Guus Hiddink, the former South Korea's manager. Kim formed a strong rivalry with Lee Woon-jae in the K League and the national team, and also competed with him for the position as a starter in the 2002 FIFA World Cup. Hiddink agonised over the choice of a goalkeeper until the start of the tournament, but selected Lee because of Kim's eccentric play in the Lunar New Year Cup.

After retirement
Kim is currently working as a YouTuber in the "Kkong-byung-ji-tv", his YouTube channel, after his retirement in 2015.

On 27 January 2021, Kim was appointed a vice-president of the Korea Football Association (KFA).

On 28 May 2022, Kim signed with entertainment company Angry Dogs.

Kim became the president of Gangwon FC on 15 December 2022, and he resigned from KFA the next month to concentrate on Gangwon.

Career statistics

Club

International

Filmography

Television

Honours

Player 
Sangmu FC
Korean Semi-professional League (Spring): 1992
Korean Semi-professional League (Autumn): 1991

Ulsan Hyundai Horang-i
K League 1: 1996
Korean FA Cup runner-up: 1998
Korean League Cup: 1995, 1998

Pohang Steelers
Korean FA Cup runner-up: 2001, 2002

FC Seoul
Korean League Cup: 2006

South Korea
FIFA World Cup fourth place: 2002

Individual
Korean Semi-professional League (Autumn) Best Player: 1991
K League 1 Best XI: 1996, 1998, 2005, 2007
K League All-Star Game Most Valuable Player: 2000

Entertainer

References

External links

 
 Kim Byung-ji – National Team Stats at KFA 
 
 

1970 births
Living people
Association football goalkeepers
South Korean footballers
South Korea international footballers
Ulsan Hyundai FC players
Pohang Steelers players
FC Seoul players
Gyeongnam FC players
Jeonnam Dragons players
K League 1 players
1996 AFC Asian Cup players
1998 FIFA World Cup players
2000 CONCACAF Gold Cup players
2002 CONCACAF Gold Cup players
2002 FIFA World Cup players
People from Miryang
Footballers at the 1998 Asian Games
South Korean association football commentators
Asian Games competitors for South Korea
South Korean YouTubers
Sportspeople from South Gyeongsang Province